Lakshmana Pandita was the author of Vaidyarajavallabha (also known as Vaidyavallabha), a Sanskrit book on Ayurveda  written during the Vijayanagara Empire in the  15th Century. He was a Paramacharya of King Bukka II.

His other popular work is YogaCandrika, a treatise on Ayurvedic medicine.

Notes

References
 Durga Prasad, History of Andhras, Guntur, 1988, page no - 270.

Writers from Karnataka
Ayurvedacharyas
Indian medical writers
15th-century Indian writers
People of the Vijayanagara Empire
Scholars of Vijayanagara Empire

External links 
List of Ayurvedic Indian books
Indian medicine books
Hindi translation of Lakshmana Pandita's work